Ferdowsiyeh (also Romanized as Ferdowsīyeh; also known as Ferdows, Ferdowsī, and Gorāzābād) is a village in Azizabad Rural District, in the Central District of Narmashir County, Kerman Province, Iran. At the 2006 census, its population was 787, in 170 families.

References 

Populated places in Narmashir County